Armale is a town in  Sanaag region of Somaliland

History
In July 2007, the district became part of the Maakhir province of Somalia, which was later incorporated into the autonomous Puntland region in January 2009.

Geography
The town is located in the Hadeed Plateau, a tract of land that covers the middle section of a large area of the Sool Plateau. With the exception of the Riafonleh mountain, this plateau is largely flat.

Notes

References
Carmaale, Somalia

Populated places in Sanaag
Cities in Maakhir
Archaeological sites in Somalia